Love Today may refer to:
 "Love Today" (song), a 2007 song by Mika
 Love Today (1997 film), an Indian Tamil-language romantic drama film
 Love Today (2004 film), a Telugu film
 Love Today (2022 film), a Tamil film